The Lanzhou–Chengdu Pipeline is a crude oil pipeline in China. Connected to the Ürümqi–Lanzhou pipeline, it transports crude oil produced in Xinjiang as also imported through the Kazakhstan–China oil pipeline to south-western China.  Among other customers it supplies the Pengzhou refinery.  The pipeline is owned by China National Petroleum Corporation.

History
The pipeline project was announced in 2007 and it was approved in September 2010.  Construction started in November 2010.  The pipeline was completed in March 2013.

Technical description
The  pipeline starts at the Lanzhou terminal and finish at the Pengzhou terminal.  It runs through Gansu, Shaanxi and Sichuan provinces.  En route it traverse China's most challenging terrain, including the Qin Mountains.

It uses X65 spiral submerged-arc-welded pipes. It has the highest pipe pressure and largest hydraulic head among the pipelines in China.

The cost about US$527 million.

References

Energy infrastructure completed in 2013
Oil pipelines in China